The willowherb hawkmoth (Proserpinus proserpina) is a moth in the family Sphingidae. The species was first described by Peter Simon Pallas in 1772.

Distribution 
It is found in Armenia, Austria, Azerbaijan, Belgium, Bulgaria, Denmark, France, Germany, Greece, Hungary, Iran, Iraq, Israel, Italy, Kazakhstan, Lebanon, Morocco, Netherlands, Portugal, Poland Spain, Switzerland, Syria, Turkey, Turkmenistan, Ukraine, Uzbekistan, and Bosnia and Herzegovina.

Description
The wingspan is 36–60 mm. It is highly variable in size but the colour variation is minimal. It is generally a shade of green. Form schmidti has yellow-grey forewings and grey hindwings, form brunnea has a pale leatherish coloration with a reddish median band and form grisea has the green coloration entirely replaced by grey.

Biology 
The habitat mainly consists of damp, woodland clearings and edges of woods, especially in valleys. It is also found on sandy waste ground in and around towns. In the Alps, it can be found up to 1,500 meters, in Spain up to 2,000 meters and in Afghanistan up to 1,900 meters.
In Europe, there is one generation per year with adults on wing in late May and early June. In the south of the range it is found in mid-May and at higher altitudes in the Pyrenees it is on wing in June and July. There are two generations per year in North Africa, with adults on wing in March and again from June to July.

The larvae feed on Epilobium (including Epilobium hirsutum), Oenothera and Lythrum species.

References

External links

Willowherb hawkmoth UKMoths
BioLib.cz
Lepiforum e.V.

Macroglossini
Moths described in 1772
Moths of Europe
Moths of Asia
Moths of Africa
Taxa named by Peter Simon Pallas
Taxonomy articles created by Polbot